Carex ligulata is a species of flowering plant in the sedge family, Cyperaceae. Carex ligulata is native to Asia from India to Japan. It grows in a variety of habitats, including grasslands, forests, mountain slopes, and riparian areas.

References

ligulata
Flora of Asia